Edward Leeds may refer to:

Edward Leeds (priest) (died 1590), English Reformation-era precentor
Edward Leeds (barrister) (bapt. 1693 – 1758), English lawyer
Sir Edward Leeds, 3rd Baronet (1825–1876), of the Leeds baronets of Croxton Park
Sir Edward Leeds, 5th Baronet (1859–1924), of the Leeds baronets of Croxton Park
Edward Thurlow Leeds (1877–1955), English archaeologist
Ned Leeds, comic book character in Marvel'''s Spider-Man'' series